CH Madrid is an ice hockey team in Madrid, Spain. It played in the Superliga Espanola de Hockey Hielo from 1972-1975 and from 2002-2006.

History
The club was started in 1972 and was one of the six founding members of the Superliga. In their first season, Madrid finished as runner-up in the Superliga. It played in the Superliga from 1972-1975. The club was revived for the 2002-03 season. CH Madrid has only participated in unofficial tournaments and friendly games since 2006.

Results
1973 2nd place
1974 3rd place
1975 ?
1976-2003 Did not participate
2003 Lost semifinal
2004 5th place
2005 5th place
2006 Lost quarterfinal

External links
 Official website
 Last roster at Eliteprospects

Madrid
Sports teams in Madrid
Madrid
1972 establishments in Spain